The 1970-71 season was Chelsea Football Club's 57th of competitive football, and their 44th in the English top flight.

Squad statistics

Substitute appearances in parenthesis. Substitute appearances included in totals

Results

First Division

FA Charity Shield

League Cup

UEFA Cup Winner's Cup

FA Cup

Notes

References
Soccerbase
Hockings, Ron. 100 Years of the Blues: A Statistical History of Chelsea Football Club. (2007)

Chelsea Fc Season, 1970-71
Chelsea F.C. seasons
UEFA Cup Winners' Cup-winning seasons